Tonghua or Tong Hua may refer to:

Places 
 Tonghua City
 Tonghua County
 Tonghua Province

People 
 Tong Hua (writer), Chinese romance novelist who writes under the pseudonym "Zhang Xiaosan"

Other uses 
 Tong Hua, an alternate name for Fairy Tale, an album by Michael Wong